Snake Fang is a 1990 Iranian war film directed by Masoud Kimiai. It was entered into the 41st Berlin International Film Festival where it won an Honourable Mention.

Cast
 Golchehre Sajadieh as Siwar
 Ahmad Najafi as Ahmad
 Faramarz Sadighi as Reza
 Hassan Rafi'i
 Fariba Kowsari as Fatemeh
 Jalal Moghadam
 Nosratallah Karimi
 Saeid Pirdoost
 Nersi Gorgia
 Mohammad Abdollahi
 Abbas Ghajar
 Reza Khandan
 Mohammad Vali Ahmadloo
 Shahed Ahmadloo
 Hossein Memarzadeh

Awards
 Honourable Mention 41st Berlin International Film Festival 1991
 Special Jury Prize Montreal World Film Festival 1992

References

External links

 Jurnal side - Masoud Kimiai Work's
 FilmAffinity
 Mubi

1990 films
1990s war films
1990s Persian-language films
Iranian war drama films
Films directed by Masoud Kimiai